Ivan Babiy (March 5, 1893 – July 25, 1934) was a Ukrainian educator and military officer. He was one of the main organizers of the "Ukrainian Youth for Christ" festival and a proponent of coexistence between Ukrainians and Poles in Galicia as an integral part of Poland. Babiy was killed on the orders of the Organization of Ukrainian Nationalists (OUN).
He was assassinated by decision of the Organization of Ukrainian Nationalists (OUN)

Biography 
He was born on March 5, 1893, in the village of Dobromirka (now in Zbarazh district of Ternopil region, Ukraine) into a peasant family.

Babij graduated from a high school in Tarnopol, then studied classical philology at the Jan Kazimierz University in Lwów. Following the start of World War I in 1914 he was called into the Austro-Hungarian Army, where he served in the Ukrainian Sich Riflemen. In 1918-1919 he fought against Poland in the Ukrainian Galician Army and in 1920 participated as an officer of the Ukrainian People's Army in the Kyiv Offensive of the joint Polish-Ukrainian forces.

Later, he became a principal of a high school in Brzeżany, then, in 1931, took the post of principal of a Ukrainian high school in Lwów. He organized the Youth for Christ festival in western Ukraine. Babij openly criticized the Organization of Ukrainian Nationalists, which resulted in death sentence, passed by the Revolutionary Tribunal of the OUN. He was murdered by OUN's activist Mykhaylo Car. The assassination was publicly condemned by the Ukrainian Archbishop Andrey Sheptytsky.

The revolutionary tribunal of the Organization of Ukrainian Nationalists sentenced him to death. In this regard, on July 27, 1934, an OUN militant killed Babiy in Lviv.  As it turned out, Babiy was assigned police protection, and when the attacker realized that he would not be able to escape, he tried to shoot himself. In the hospital, the militant regained consciousness and confessed that he was a member of the OUN and his name was Mykhailo Tsar, originally from Pozdymyr. On August 17, the killer died of his wound.

Sources 
 Andrzej Chojnowski, Jan Bruski - "Ukraina", Warszawa 2006,

References 

1893 births
1934 deaths
People from Ternopil Oblast
People from the Kingdom of Galicia and Lodomeria
Ukrainian Austro-Hungarians
Ukrainian educators
Ukrainian military personnel
Austro-Hungarian military personnel of World War I
Ukrainian Galician Army people
20th-century Ukrainian educators
Victims of the Organization of Ukrainian Nationalists